Calistoga Depot is a former train station in Calistoga, California.

History
The station building was built in 1868 by Sam Brannan, who intended to bring in tourists to the area by his Napa Valley Railroad – the first passengers arrived that October. Southern Pacific Railroad purchased the line in 1885, and the Depot was folded into their system. Passenger service ended in 1929.

The Depot is registered as a California Historical Landmark on July 31, 1959; it is listed as number 687. It was additionally listed on the National Register of Historic Places on April 18, 1977 as Napa Valley Railroad Depot.

The building was restored in 1978 by Calistoga Depot Associates. That year, Central Pacific Coach No. 12 was moved to the depot to act as tenant space, housing a wine shop for over 30 years. The car was moved to the California State Railroad Museum in 2020 for restoration.

In 2017, the property was purchased by the Merchant family, owners of the nearby Indian Springs Resort and Spa.

Design
The building was painted white in 2020; it had previously been Colonial yellow since 1906.

References

Railway stations in Napa County, California
Railway stations in the United States opened in 1868
Railway stations closed in 1929
Former Southern Pacific Railroad stations in California
National Register of Historic Places in Napa County, California
Railway stations on the National Register of Historic Places in California
California Historical Landmarks